Maple Mountain High School is a public high school in Spanish Fork, Utah, United States that serves the Spanish Fork and Mapleton areas. Known for being the location of Gordon Ramsay’s School of the Culinary Arts, and a truly amazing football team. :D

Organization
The school is managed by the Nebo School District.  It educates over 1,200 students and enrolls upwards of 400 students in each grade. The school was founded in 2009.

School identity
Maple Mountain's school colors are maroon and gold with forest green highlights, and their mascot is the Golden Eagle.

References

External links

 

Buildings and structures in Spanish Fork, Utah
Schools in Utah County, Utah
Public high schools in Utah
Educational institutions established in 2009
2009 establishments in Utah